Big Meadows, California may refer to:
 Big Meadow, California, in Calaveras County
 Chester, California (formerly Big Meadows), in Plumas County